Frankfort Springs is a borough in southern Beaver County, Pennsylvania, United States. The population was 117 at the 2020 census. It is a part of the Pittsburgh metropolitan area.

Surrounding neighborhoods
Frankfort Springs has two borders, with Hanover Township to the north, east and west and with Washington County's Hanover Township to the south.

Demographics

As of the census of 2000, there were 130 people, 48 households, and 33 families residing in the borough. The population density was 520.4 people per square mile (200.8/km²). There were 51 housing units at an average density of 204.1 per square mile (78.8/km²). The racial makeup of the borough was 100.00% White. Hispanic or Latino of any race were 0.77% of the population.

There were 48 households, out of which 22.9% had children under the age of 18 living with them, 52.1% were married couples living together, 10.4% had a female householder with no husband present, and 29.2% were non-families. 29.2% of all households were made up of individuals, and 8.3% had someone living alone who was 65 years of age or older. The average household size was 2.71 and the average family size was 3.32.

In the borough the population was spread out, with 20.0% under the age of 18, 13.1% from 18 to 24, 26.2% from 25 to 44, 26.2% from 45 to 64, and 14.6% who were 65 years of age or older. The median age was 40 years. For every 100 females, there were 88.4 males. For every 100 females age 18 and over, there were 92.6 males.

The median income for a household in the borough was $31,458, and the median income for a family was $32,292. Males had a median income of $26,667 versus $26,042 for females. The per capita income for the borough was $12,776. There were 12.8% of families and 21.5% of the population living below the poverty line, including 28.0% of under eighteens and 15.4% of those over 64.

Education
Children in Frankfort Springs are served by the South Side Area School District. The current schools serving Frankfort Springs are:
 South Side Elementary School –  grades K-5
 South Side Middle School – grades 6-8
 South Side High School – grades 9-12

Notable people
 Warren S. Dungan – Lieutenant Governor of Iowa
 Robert Martin – acting Governor of Oklahoma Territory from 1891 to 1892
 J. R. Miller – Christian author, pastor, Editorial Superintendent of the Presbyterian Board of Publication

References

Populated places established in 1772
Pittsburgh metropolitan area
Boroughs in Beaver County, Pennsylvania
1884 establishments in Pennsylvania